The following lists events that happened during 2012 in the Republic of Azerbaijan.

Events

January 
January 1 – Azerbaijan accepted status of non-permanent member of the Security Council.

March 
March 23 - Maine adopted a resolution on Khojaly Massacre.

February 
February 1 - The Foreign Relations Committee of Senate of Pakistan adopted a resolution on the recognition of Khojaly Massacre

February 24 - State of Georgia adopted a Resolution 1594 recognizing the 20th anniversary of the Khojaly Massacre

April 
April 2–4 - The Second Ordinary Session of  Euronest Parliamentary Assembly was organized in Baku.

May 
May 7 - Baku Crystal Hall was opened with the participation of Ilham Aliyev.

May 9–13 - The first international bicycle tour was organized in memory of Heydar Aliyev.

May 10 - Heydar Aliyev Center was opened on the 89th birthday anniversary of Heydar Aliyev.

May 22–26 - Eurovision Song Contest 2012

September 
September 22-October 13 - 2012 FIFA U-17 Women's World Cup is held in Azerbaijan.

December 
December 30 - The development concept “Azerbaijan 2020: a look into the future” was adopted by the decree of Ilham Aliyev

References